Ana Zubashvili is a Georgian beauty queen who was crowned Miss Georgia 2014. She competed at Miss World 2014 and Miss Universe 2014.

Early life
Ana was a student at Tbilisi State University.

Pageantry

Miss Georgia 2014
Ana was crowned as Miss Georgia 2014 on 9 February 2014, at the Pavilion in the capital city of Tbilisi.

Miss World 2014
Ana represented Georgia at the Miss World 2014 pageant in London but Unplaced.

Miss Universe 2014
Ana represented Georgia at the Miss Universe 2014 pageant but Unplaced.

References

External links
 

Beauty pageant winners from Georgia (country)
Living people
Models from Tbilisi
1993 births
Miss Universe 2014 contestants
Miss World 2014 delegates
Miss Georgia (country) winners
Female models from Georgia (country)